Monster Rancher Explorer (known as  in Japan) is a Game Boy Color puzzle game released in 2000. It features the same game play of Solomon's Key but includes Monster Rancher characters.

Gameplay
The player controls Cox, who must navigate through a series of levels in a tower. In certain levels the player can unlock a bonus round, where they can capture a monster to aid them in the game.

Reception

The game received "average" reviews according to the review aggregation website GameRankings. In Japan, Famitsu gave it a score of 25 out of 40.

References

External links

2000 video games
Game Boy Color games
Game Boy Color-only games
Monster Rancher
Puzzle video games
Video games developed in Japan